Achim Beierlorzer (born 20 November 1967) is a German football coach, who most recently served as the interim manager of RB Leipzig. He is the younger brother of Bertram Beierlorzer.

Playing career
Beierlorzer was never a professional football player but played for 1. FC Nürnberg U-19 and the second team.

Coaching career
Beierlorzer started coaching at lower level club SV Kleinsendelbach. From 2010 he managed the U-17 of Greuther Fürth. After that, he had been head coach of the under 17 team for RB Leipzig who he led to table position one in the youth Bundesliga.

Beierlorzer became interim head coach of second Bundesliga side RB Leipzig on 11 February 2015 after Alexander Zorniger's contract was ended mutually. His first match was a 1–0 loss against FSV Frankfurt on 15 February 2015. He managed the team for the remainder of the season and had his final match on 24 May 2015 against Greuther Fürth which Leipzig won 2–0. He was replaced by Ralf Rangnick on 29 May 2015. He was retained as an assistant. He finished with a record of six wins, three draws, and five losses.

On 26 June 2017, he was appointed as the new head coach of Jahn Regensburg. After a successful two-year spell at the club, it was announced that Beierlorzer would be appointed to the vacant head coaching position at 1. FC Köln. He was given a contract until 2021. He was sacked on 9 November 2019. He was appointed as head coach of Mainz 05 on 18 November 2019. After a 4–1 loss against VfB Stuttgart at the start of the 2020–21 Bundesliga season, Beierlorzer was sacked.

On 5 December 2021, Beierlorzer was again appointed interim coach of RB Leipzig after the club and Jesse Marsch parted ways.

Coaching record

References

External links

1967 births
Living people
Sportspeople from Erlangen
German footballers
Footballers from Bavaria
Association football midfielders
Regionalliga players
1. FC Nürnberg II players
SpVgg Greuther Fürth players
RB Leipzig managers
2. Bundesliga managers
SSV Jahn Regensburg managers
Bundesliga managers
1. FC Köln managers
1. FSV Mainz 05 managers
German football managers
Universiade medalists in football
Universiade bronze medalists for Germany
Medalists at the 1993 Summer Universiade